Cyrtodactylus himalayicus,  also known as the Himalaya bent-toed gecko, is a species of gecko endemic to India. It is sometimes considered conspecific with the Khasi Hills bent-toed gecko.

References

Cyrtodactylus
Reptiles described in 1906
Endemic fauna of India
Reptiles of India